Amelia Marguerite Badel (stage name, Rigolboche; nicknamed "the Huguenot"; Nancy, 13 June 1842 - Bobigny, 1 February 1920) was a French dancer. Credited for inventing the can-can, her acme occurred from 1858 to 1861. Her stage name, Rigolboche, is a slang term formed from the word "funny" and the suffix boche designating a "joker" or a very funny person.

References

 Ernest Blum, Mémoires de Rigolboche, Paris, 1860, 188 p., portrait photographique.

External links
Théodore de Banville, Les Camées parisiens, Petite bibliothèque des curieux, éd. René Pincebourde, Paris, 1866. 

1842 births
1920 deaths
People from Nancy, France
French female dancers
19th-century French dancers
People of the Second French Empire